George B. N. Ayittey (13 October 1945 – 28 January 2022) was a Ghanaian economist, author, and president of the Free Africa Foundation in Washington, D.C. He was a professor at American University, and an associate scholar at the Foreign Policy Research Institute.

He championed the argument that "Africa is poor because she is not free," that the primary cause of African poverty is less a result of the oppression and mismanagement by colonial powers, but rather a result of modern oppressive native autocrats and socialist central planning policies. He also went beyond criticism of the status quo to advocate for specific ways to address the abuses of the past and present; specifically he called for democratic government, debt reexamination, modernized infrastructure, free market economics, and free trade to promote development.

Life
Ayittey attended Adisadel College for his secondary education and held a B.Sc. in economics from the University of Ghana, Legon, an M.A. from the University of Western Ontario in Canada, and a Ph.D. from the University of Manitoba. He taught at Wayne State College and Bloomsburg University of Pennsylvania. He held a National Fellowship at the Hoover Institution in 1988–89, and then joined The Heritage Foundation as a Bradley Resident Scholar. Ayittey served on the advisory board of Students For Liberty and also worked closely with the Atlas Network.

He founded The Free Africa Foundation in 1993 to serve as a catalyst for reform in Africa.
In 2008, Ayittey was listed by Foreign Policy as one of the "Top 100 Public Intellectuals" who "are shaping the tenor of our time."

Political views
Ayittey believed there are three keys to successfully rescuing Africa from oppressive despotism:
 First, he advocated forming coalitions consisting of small groups of "elders" who have no political ties and monitor the activities of the various opposition groups. Ayittey explains, "They must be able to reach out to all the opposition groups." "The council should bring all of the opposition into an alliance ", which would prevent dictators from overpowering severely divided competition.
 Second, nations have to gain control of the civil service, security forces, judiciary, election centers, and national bank. Ayittey saw control of at least one of these resources as central to subverting dictatorial power in African countries. These organizations are currently staffed by cronies of dictators throughout Africa.
 Third, and finally, a nation has to use the correct sequence of reforms.

Personal life 
George Ayittey's younger sister was the politician, Sherry Ayittey. Ayittey died on 28 January 2022 and was buried on 8 April 2022.

Published works
 Indigenous African Institutions, Transnational Publishers, 1991; 2nd ed., 2004
 The Blueprint for Ghana's Economic Recovery, Africana Publishers, 1997
 Africa Betrayed, St. Martin's Press, 1992 (Africa Betrayed won the 1992 Mencken Award for Best Book.)
 Africa in Chaos, St. Martin's Press, 1998.
 Africa Unchained: the blueprint for development, Palgrave/MacMillan, 2004
 Defeating Dictators: Fighting Tyrants in Africa and Around the World published September 2011.
 Applied Economics for Africa, Atlas Network, 2018.

References

External links
 Bio at A World Connected
 Human Rights: Africa's Shady Politicians Are at Root of Continent's Destitution, commentary by Dr. Ayittey
 
 
 TED Talks: George Ayittey on Cheetahs vs. Hippos (TEDGlobal 2007)

1945 births
2022 deaths
American University faculty and staff
Ghanaian academics
Ghanaian economists
The Heritage Foundation
University of Ghana alumni
University of Manitoba alumni
University of Western Ontario alumni
20th-century economists
Ga-Adangbe people
Alumni of Adisadel College